The Boy River is a river in Cass County, Minnesota. The river took its name from Boy Lake.

See also
List of rivers of Minnesota

References

Minnesota Watersheds
USGS Hydrologic Unit Map - State of Minnesota (1974)

Rivers of Cass County, Minnesota
Rivers of Minnesota